Joint Account is a British television sitcom produced by the BBC.

Starring Hannah Gordon and Peter Egan, the series followed the Braithwaites, a married couple. Belinda Braithwaite was the breadwinner, a bank manager, whilst David was a house-husband. The sitcom revolved around the mismatched pair and the role reversal of their domestic situation.

Two series were transmitted on BBC1 between 26 January 1989 and 21 May 1990.

Cast
 Hannah Gordon - Belinda Braithwaite
 Peter Egan - David Braithwaite
 John Bird - Ned Race
 Lill Roughley - Louise
 Ruth Mitchell - Jessica
 Richard Aylen - Charles Ruby

Home media
The complete series of Joint Account is available on DVD in the UK from Simply Media on 5 September 2016.

References

External links
 
 

BBC television sitcoms
1980s British sitcoms
1990s British sitcoms
1989 British television series debuts
1990 British television series endings
English-language television shows
Television shows set in Warwickshire